Rosario Youth Football Club (also known as Rosario Y.C.) is a Northern Irish, intermediate football club playing in the Premier division of the Northern Amateur Football League.The club has three senior teams competing in the Northern Amateur Football League and Belfast and District football league. The Club is widely recognised as one of the most successful youth clubs in Northern Ireland, with many former players competing at International Level and Professional Leagues in England. The club joined the Amateur League in 1982.

External links
 Rosario site

Notes

Association football clubs in Northern Ireland
Northern Amateur Football League clubs
1912 establishments in Ireland
Association football clubs in Belfast